Shudimari (Şudimari) is a rural locality (a village) in Itkineyevsky Selsoviet, Yanaulsky District, Bashkortostan, Russia. The population was 49 as of 2010. There is 1 street.

Geography 
Shudimari is located 10 km southeast of Yanaul (the district's administrative centre) by road. Itkineyevo is the nearest rural locality.

References 

Rural localities in Yanaulsky District